Lucky Motor Corporation (LMC) is a Pakistani automobile manufacturer which is a  part subsidiary of South Korean automobile manufacturer Kia Motors. It is a joint venture between Lucky Group and Kia Motors. Kia Lucky Motors Pakistan has recently changed its name to Lucky Motors Corporation Limited in 2020 but it does not mean that both companies have ended their partnership.  

The manufacturing plant became operational in September 2019.
Following vehicles are assembled/manufactured:

Operations in Pakistan 
In the first quarter of 2023, Lucky Motors increase the prices of their cars, primarily due to the imposition of heavy taxes by the government.This sudden increase in prices significantly affected the affordability of the vehicles for the general public, leading to a substantial decline in the company's sales figures.

Products

Kia 

 Kia Picanto (City car)
 Kia Sportage (Compact SUV)
 Kia Stonic (Subcompact Crossover SUV)
 Kia Sorento (Mid-size Crossover SUV)
 Kia Grand Carnival (KA4) (Minivan)

Peugeot 

 Peugeot 2008 (Subcompact Crossover SUV)

References

Kia Motors
Yunus Brothers Group
Pakistani subsidiaries of foreign companies
Joint ventures
Car manufacturers of Pakistan
Manufacturing companies based in Karachi
Privately held companies of Pakistan